James Arnold von der Heydt (July 15, 1919 – December 1, 2013) was a United States district judge of the United States District Court for the District of Alaska.

Education and career

Born in Miles City, Montana, von der Heydt received a Bachelor of Arts degree from Albion College in 1942. He received a Juris Doctor from Northwestern University Pritzker School of Law in 1951. He was a Deputy United States Marshal in Nome, Alaska Territory from 1945 to 1948. He was a United States Commissioner for the United States District Court for the District of Alaska Territory in 1951. He was United States Attorney for the District of Alaska Territory from 1951 to 1953. He was in private practice of law in Nome from 1953 to 1959. He was a Member of the Alaska Territory House of Representatives from 1957 to 1959. He was Presiding Judge of the Superior Court of the State of Alaska from 1959 to 1966.

Federal judicial service

Von der Heydt was nominated by President Lyndon B. Johnson on September 9, 1966, to a seat on the United States District Court for the District of Alaska vacated by Judge Walter Hartman Hodge. He was confirmed by the United States Senate on October 20, 1966, and received his commission on November 3, 1966. He served as Chief Judge from 1973 to 1984. He assumed senior status on July 15, 1984. His service terminated on December 1, 2013, due to his death in Anchorage, Alaska.

See also
 List of United States federal judges by longevity of service

References

External links
 
 A. Von James at 100 Years of Alaska's Legislature
 James von der Heydt-obituary, Anchorage Daily News

1919 births
2013 deaths
Alaska Democrats
Alaska state court judges
Albion College alumni
American people of German descent
Judges of the United States District Court for the District of Alaska
Members of the Alaska Territorial Legislature
20th-century American politicians
Northwestern University Pritzker School of Law alumni
People from Miles City, Montana
People from Nome, Alaska
United States district court judges appointed by Lyndon B. Johnson
20th-century American judges